Edward J. Kasemeyer (born July 18, 1945) is an American politician from Maryland and a member of the Democratic Party. He served for many years in the Maryland State Senate, most recently representing Maryland's district 12 in Baltimore and Howard counties.

Background
Born in Baltimore, Maryland, on July 18, 1945, Kasemeyer attended Western Maryland College. He has been active with the Howard County Association for Retarded Citizens, the Howard County Chamber of Commerce, and the Howard County General Hospital Advisory Board, as well as in the Democratic Party.

In the legislature
Kasemeyer first served in the Senate as a representative of the 14th district from January 1987 to January 1991, after a single term in the Maryland House of Delegates (elected 1982; served January 1983 to January 1987). Running for re-election to the Senate in 1990, he narrowly lost to Republican Christopher J. McCabe. After redistricting changed the district boundaries, he was elected again to the Senate in 1994, this time from the 12th district. He was re-elected five times. During part of his tenure, Kasemeyer served as the Chair of the Budget and Taxation Committee.

References

External links
Maryland Senate - Edward J. Kasemeyer official MD Senate website
Bills sponsored 2008 20072006200520042003 2002 2001 2000 1999 1998
Project Vote Smart - Senator Edward J. Kasemeyer (MD) profile
Follow the Money - Edward J. Kasemeyer
2006 2004 2002 1998 campaign contributions

Democratic Party Maryland state senators
1945 births
Living people
Democratic Party members of the Maryland House of Delegates
People from Columbia, Maryland
21st-century American politicians